The Treaty of Lahore  of 9 March 1846 was a peace-treaty marking the end of the First Anglo-Sikh War. The treaty was concluded, for the British, by the Governor-General Sir Henry Hardinge and two officers of the East India Company and, for the Sikhs, by the seven-year-old Maharaja Duleep Singh and seven members of Hazara, the territory to the south of the river Sutlej and the forts and territory in the Jalandhar Doab between the rivers Sutlej and Beas.  In addition, controls were placed on the size of the Lahore army and thirty-six field guns were confiscated. The control of the rivers Sutlej and Beas and part of the Indus passed to the British, with the proviso that this was not to interfere with the passage of passenger boats owned by the Lahore Government. Also, provision was made for the separate sale of all the hilly regions between River Beas and Indus, including Kashmir, by the East India Company at a later date to Gulab Singh, the Raja of Jammu.

The Anglo-Sikh treaties of 1846

Background

Maharaja Ranjit Singh Sukerchakia had made Lahore the capital of the Sikh Empire of the Punjab, which he built up between 1799 and his death in 1839.  After his death, factions and assassinations destroyed the unity of the State, causing alarm to the British because it weakened the buffer against the perceived threat of invasion from the north.  Provocative acts by both the British and the Sikhs escalated tension and, on 13 December 1845, Hardinge issued a proclamation declaring war on the Sikhs.

During the First Anglo-Sikh War, the British came close to defeat at the Battle of Ferozeshah, but were eventually victorious. After the defeat of the Sikhs at the Battle of Sobraon, the British marched unopposed into Lahore on 20February 1846.

During the First Anglo-Sikh War, Maharaja Gulab Singh Jamwal (Dogra) helped the British Empire against the Sikhs. After the defeat of the Sikh Empire The Treaty of Lahore (9 March 1846) and the Treaty of Amritsar (1846) (16 March 1846) were signed. As part of The Treaty of Lahore, signed between the 7 year old Maharaja Duleep Singh (Sikh) (4 September 1838 – 22 October 1893) and the British Empire on (9 March 1846), Jammu was taken over by the British Empire on paper.
Article 12 of the Treaty of Lahore stated:
"In consideration of the services rendered by Rajah Golab Sing of Jummoo, to the Lahore State, towards procuring the restoration of the relations of amity between the Lahore and British Governments, the Maharajah hereby agrees to recognize the Independent sovereignty of Rajah Golab Sing in such territories and districts in the hills as may be made over to the said Rajah Golab Sing, by separate Agreement between himself and the British Government, with the dependencies thereof, which may have been in the Rajah's possession since the time of the late Maharajah Khurruck Sing, and the British Government, in consideration of the good conduct of Rajah Golab Sing, also agrees to recognize his independence in such territories, and to admit him to the privileges of a separate Treaty with the British Government."

Then as part of the Treaty of Amritsar (1846) Maharaja Gulab Singh Jamwal agreed to serve the British Empire under Article 6:  "Maharajah Gulab Singh engages for himself and heirs to join, with the whole of his Military Forces, the British troops when employed within the hills or in the territories adjoining his possessions." and in exchange under Article 9 "The British Government will give its aid to Maharajah Gulab Singh in protecting his territories from external enemies."  After which the Dogras served the British Empire in the Indian Rebellion and in the various wars. Hence a large percentage of the Kashmiris fought in the First World War and in the Second World Wars, as part of the Jammu and Kashmir State Forces and directly with the Royal Navy, The British Army, the merchant navy and Gilgit Scouts as mentioned by Major William A. Brown in his book The Gilgit Rebellion 1947.

Hence 1.1 million Kashmiris now live in the UK. The high taxes to support these wars were resented by all the Kashmiris including the Hindus, Muslims and the Sikhs. And combined with the tens of thousands of trained men, coming back from the Second World War generated a highly volatile situation in 1947.

Lacking the resources to occupy such a large region immediately after annexing portions of Punjab, the British got Gulab Singh pay 75 thousand Nanakshahee Rupees for the war-indemnity. The angry courtiers of Lahore (particularly the baptized Sikh, Lal Singh) then incited the governor of Kashmir to rebel against Gulab Singh, but this rebellion was defeated, thanks in great part to the action of Herbert Edwardes, Assistant Resident at Lahore. The Kashmiris also rebelled throughout Jammu and Kashmir.

To pay for this, from the very start the Kashmiris were heavily taxed and complained of being sold into slavery and extensive literature was written by the British writers regarding these treaties The Slavery Abolition Act 1833 (3 & 4 Will. IV c. 73) abolished slavery throughout the British Empire. The Slavery Abolition Act 1833 (3 & 4 Will. IV c. 73) came into force before the Treaty of Amritsar (1846) was signed (16 March 1846). As far back as 1868 in the book Cashmere Misgovernment, Robert Thorp stated that the people of Kashmir were sold into slavery to Gulab Singh. Arthur Brinkman in his paper "The Wrongs of Cashmere" written in December 1867, also states he: "informs the reader of the wretched condition of a people we sold against their inclination, and their united cry to us." Arthur Brinkman was an Anglican Missionry and the Anglican Missionary Groups had worked with the Anti Slavery Society to push for The Slavery Abolition Act 1833 a few years earlier

Peace treaty
The peace treaty was negotiated and drafted by Frederick Currie, assisted on military matters by Brevet-Major Henry Lawrence, acting under powers vested in them by Hardinge. Currie's diplomatic skills so impressed Hardinge that the British authorities rewarded him with a baronetcy in January 1847.

On 11March 1846, two days after signature of the Treaty, a supplement, comprising eight Articles of Agreement, was signed by the same parties.  It provided that a British force would remain in Lahore until no longer than the end of the year "for the purpose of protecting the person of the Maharajah and the inhabitants of the City of Lahore, during the reorganization of the Sikh Army".  This supplementary agreement was at the request of the Lahore Durbar. The Lahore army would vacate the City, convenient quarters would be provided for the British troops and the Lahore Government would pay the extra expenses.

The Agreement also provided that the British would respect the bona fide rights of jagirdars in the Lahore territories and would assist the Lahore Government in recovering the arrears of revenue justly due to the Lahore Government from the kardars and managers in the territories ceded by the provisions of Articles 3 and 4 of the Treaty.

The Treaty of Amritsar

The British demanded payment of 15 million rupees (one and a half crore) as reparations for the cost of the war.  As the Lahore Government was unable to pay the whole of this sum immediately, it ceded some of the territories mentioned above, including Hazara and Kashmir, as equivalent to 10 million rupees (one crore).  The Maharaja was also required to pay 6 million rupees (60 lakhs) immediately.

The British then sold Kashmir to the Raja of Jammu, Gulab Singh, for 7.5 million rupees (75 lakhs). The treaty of sale was concluded on 16March 1846, in the Treaty of Amritsar and signed by Gulab Singh, Hardinge, Currie and Lawrence. Gulab Singh thus became the founder and first Maharaja of the princely state of Kashmir and Jammu.

The Treaty of Bhyroval

The supplementary Articles of Agreement had specified that the British troops would remain in Lahore until no later than the end of 1846. When the time approached for the British to leave, the Durbar requested that the troops should remain until the Maharaja attained the age of 16. The British consented to this and new articles of agreement were drawn up, forming the Treaty of Bhyroval.  This was signed on 26 December 1846, by Currie, Lawrence and 13 members of the Durbar and later ratified by Hardinge and the young Maharaja..

A key condition of the British agreement was that a Resident British officer, with an efficient establishment of assistants, was to be appointed by the Governor-General to remain at Lahore, with "full authority to direct and control all matters in every Department of the State". The Regent, Maharani Jindan Kaur, mother of the Maharaja, was awarded an annual pension of 150,000 rupees  and replaced by a Council of Regency composed of leading Chiefs and Sirdars acting under the control and guidance of the British Resident.  This effectively gave the British control of the Government.

Text of the 1846 Treaty of Lahore as signed on March 9, 1846
Treaty between the British Government and the State of Lahore, 1846.

Text of the 1849 Last Treaty of Lahore
Signed between Duleep Singh and the East India Company following the British conquest of the Punjab, 1849.

See also
List of treaties
Treaty of Amritsar, 1846
Treaty of Amritsar, 1809

References

1846 in India
Indian documents
History of Pakistan
1846 treaties
Treaties of the Sikh Empire
Treaties of the British East India Company
History of Lahore
March 1846 events